The 1991 Bandy World Championship was contested between eight men's bandy playing nations. The championship was played in Finland from 17–24 March 1991. Canada, Hungary and the Netherlands made their championship debuts. The Soviet Union became champions in what would become its last tournament; less than a year later, the Soviet Union was dissolved and would be replaced in international bandy briefly by the Commonwealth of Independent States and then permanently by Russia. The final game was played at Oulunkylä Ice Rink in Helsinki. Canada's national men's bandy team made their world bandy debut at this tournament.

Group A

Premier tour
 17 March
Sweden – Finland       10 – 4
Soviet Union – Norway  12 – 0
 18 March
Finland – Norway       11 – 2
Soviet Union – Sweden   3 – 4
 20 March
Sweden – Norway         6 – 1
Soviet Union – Finland   1 – 2

Group B

Premier tour
 17 March
USA – Canada	       10 – 0
Hungary – Netherlands  3 – 2
 18 March
Canada – Netherlands   8 – 0
USA – Hungary         20 – 0
 20 March
USA – Netherlands      8 – 1
Canada – Hungary	7 – 1

Final Tour

Quarter-finals
 21 March
Norway – USA               2 – 1

Semifinals
 22 March
 Soviet Union – Finland    3 – 2
 Sweden – Norway           6 – 0

Match for 7th place
 23 March
Hungary – Netherlands      1 – 4

Match for 5th place
 23 March
USA – Canada              13 – 0

Match for 3rd place
 24 March
Finland – Norway           8 – 0

Final
 24 March
 Sweden – Soviet Union           3 – 4

References

1991
World Championship
Bandy World Championship
International bandy competitions hosted by Finland
Bandy World Championship